Atlin (Tlingit: Wéinaa) is a community in northwestern British Columbia, Canada, located on the eastern shore of Atlin Lake. In addition to continued gold-mining activity, Atlin is a tourist destination for fishing, hiking and heliskiing. As of 2016, there are 477 permanent residents.

The name comes from Áa Tlein, the Tlingit language word for "big body of water". The surrounding area has been used by Inland Tlingit people for many years and the community is home to the Taku River Tlingit First Nation.

Every July, the town hosts the Atlin Arts & Music Festival in Tarahne Park. However, the festival did not take place in 2010 or 2020.

History

The exact time when prospectors arrived in Atlin is unknown. George Miller is supposed to be the first person to have learned of the presence of gold within the area surrounding Atlin. The two men most commonly referred to as the "founders" of Atlin are Frederick Miller and Kenneth McLaren, who staked claims along the nearby Pine Creek in 1898. The Atlin Gold Rush came to Atlin Lake country in 1898 and was one of the richest offshoots of the Klondike Gold Rush. By the end of the mining season of 1899, around 5,000 people had flocked to the region and Atlin became a busy and important settlement, centre of the Atlin Mining District, and one of the flash-points of the Alaska boundary dispute. Although production was greater in its early years, the Atlin field still produces. Total placer gold production has exceeded $23,000,000.

In the 1920s, Atlin was popular as an exotic tourist destination. There was no road to the settlement, requiring tourists to travel up the Inside Passage through the British Columbia Coast and the Alaska Panhandle and via passes through Alaska and a series of lakes in Yukon and British Columbia. The journey ended when the M.V. Tarahne (and other lake boats) took the tourists across the lake to stay at the large three storey Atlin Inn (built by the White Pass and Yukon Route company). It was during this time it was nicknamed the "Switzerland of the North" because it is surrounded by mountains in much the same way as Switzerland. During the Great Depression, tourism decreased and the White Pass and Yukon Route closed their transportation routes and hotel. Atlin was largely isolated from transportation and commerce until the Atlin Road was built in 1950–51.

Infrastructure
Atlin can be reached via the Atlin Road (Yukon Territorial Highway 7; no number in B.C.) that is maintained jointly by the British Columbia and Yukon governments. At its Yukon terminus, the Atlin Road connects to the Tagish Road and the Alaska Highway (Highway 1). It can also be reached through Atlin Airport.  Prior to the 1950 construction of the Atlin Road by the Canadian Army, Atlin was reached overland by two lake steamers, the Tutshi and Tarahne, with a two-mile rail line between the lakes they plied, until the 1930s, then was isolated.

Atlin telephone service is provided by Telus Communications since the independent company serving Atlin was merged into B.C. Tel in the mid-20th Century, and B.C. Tel merged with Telus in 2000.

There is internet provided by the local ISP Atlin Community Network and Xplornet but no cell phone service in Atlin.

Atlin long relied on a local diesel generator, but hydroelectric power was restored around 2012 with a micro-hydro project near where one historically operated. The output is sufficient for local use, but expansion is being studied, with the possible sale of surplus to Yukon Energy.

Atlin has a radio repeater carrying CBC Radio One, and used to have a community-owned television transmitter carrying CBC Television by satellite; when first established, the CBC TV signal was relayed from Whitehorse by a repeater on White Mountain near Jake's Corner. Currently, the only available TV service is through Shaw in Whitehorse.

Climate
Atlin has a subarctic climate (Köppen Dsc) with long, cold winters and short, mild summers. The westerly location and minor Pacific influence, however, makes the winters markedly less severe than in most of northern Canada, and the town is among the northernmost in Canada with a mean annual temperature above .

Television
Atlin was featured on the historical television series Gold Trails and Ghost Towns, season 1, episode 9.

See also
 Atlin Volcanic Field
 Atlin Arts & Music Festival

References

Further reading

External links

 Discover Atlin
 Atlin Arts & Music Festival

Unincorporated settlements in British Columbia
Mining communities in British Columbia
Atlin District
Stikine Country
Populated places in the Regional District of Kitimat–Stikine
Populated places on the Stikine River